The black-cheeked waxbill or red-rumped waxbill (Brunhilda charmosyna) is a common species of estrildid finch found in east Africa. It has an estimated global extent of occurrence of 400,000 km2.

It is found in Ethiopia, Kenya, Somalia, South Sudan and Tanzania. The status of the species is evaluated as Least Concern.

References

BirdLife Species Factsheet

black-cheeked waxbill
Birds of the Horn of Africa
black-cheeked waxbill
Birds of East Africa
Taxobox binomials not recognized by IUCN